The Under Secretary for Nuclear Security, in the United States Department of Energy, is the Administrator for the National Nuclear Security Administration. The National Nuclear Security Administration's responsibilities include designing, producing, and maintaining safe, secure and reliable nuclear weapons for the U.S. military, providing safe, militarily effective naval nuclear propulsion plants, and promoting international nuclear safety and nonproliferation. The current Under Secretary is Jill Hruby.

The Under Secretary for Nuclear Security is appointed by the president and confirmed by the Senate. The Under Secretary is required to have extensive background in national security, organizational management, and appropriate technical fields. The Under Secretary is also a member of the Nuclear Weapons Council, and is the chair of the Council when a majority votes that the issue at hand is the primary concern of the Department of Energy. The Under Secretary is paid at level III of the Executive Schedule.

Officeholders

References